Ana Maria in Novela Land is a 2015 romantic comedy film about a titular superfan switching places with her favorite telenovela character, Ariana Tomosa. It opened theatrically on February 27, 2015 in select markets through AMC, and stars Edy Ganem, Luis Guzmán, Michael Steger, Juan Pablo Gamboa and Elizabeth Peña in her final film role. It was developed and distributed by Fluency, as part of NBC Universal.

Plot 
Ana Maria (Edy Ganem) is a bored twentysomething living in Los Angeles. After she gets fired from her job, bails on her best friend (Carla Morrison),  and blows off her sister’s (Mercedes Masohn) bridal fitting, Ana Maria gets into a fight with her mother (Elizabeth Peña) and father (Nestor Serrano) about where her life is going. Her only solace at the end of a crummy day is watching the telenovela Pasión Sin Limites (Passion Without Limits) which features her favorite bad girl character, Ariana Tomosa (Edy Ganem). In the novela, Ariana has just been blackmailed by the evil lawyer Schmidt (Luis Guzmán) after being caught in a love triangle between the wealthy Eduardo (Juan Pablo Gamboa) and his sexy son Armando (Michael Steger).

When both Ana Maria and Ariana simultaneously complain about their lives, lightning strikes and the two women switch places. Ana Maria thinks she's having the best dream ever and begins to live out all of her novela fangirl fantasies as Ariana: romancing the two leading men and enjoying the pampered life of the volatile leading lady. Back in the real world, Ariana believes she's been kidnapped, runs away from Ana Maria's family, slaps a cop and gets bailed out of jail by Ana Maria's neighbor, the cute boy next door, Tony (Michael Steger). In Novela Land, Ana Maria’s romp is interrupted when she gets a call from her best friend who warns that Ana Maria might be stuck in the show forever unless she can figure out why she ended up there in the first place. Meanwhile, in the real world, a psychiatrist (Tamara Taylor) diagnoses Ariana as having amnesia and advises Ana Maria's parents to cut their flaky daughter some slack. Comforted by Ana Maria's family and the lovestruck Tony, Ariana begins to enjoy her new life as Ana Maria.

The real Ana Maria has a made mess in the novela, alienating everyone and putting her life in jeopardy. But using her knowledge of novelas, Ana Maria conceives a plan to set things right: she fakes her own death, gathering all the characters at her wake and confesses that her selfishness has caused them all undue grief. Her admission triggers the novela's final twist: the return of the novela's secret villain played by the legendary Lupita Ferrer. After Schmidt shoots Ana Maria in the stomach, she takes one final selfie. This epic moment transports Ana Maria and Ariana back to their respective worlds. Ariana returns with the desire to explore a world bigger than the novela written for her and Ana Maria makes it back in time to serve as her sister’s maid of honor – the supporting role she refused to play before the start of her journey.

Cast 
 Edy Ganem as Ana Maria / Ariana
 Michael Steger as Tony / Armando
 Luis Guzman as Schmidt
 Tamara Taylor as Dr. Acevedo Bechdel
 Mercedes Masohn as Ana Gloria
 Sung Kang as Korean Soap Star
 Nestor Serrano as Sr. Soto
 Juan Pablo Gamboa as Eduardo
 Dyana Ortelli as Mercedes
 Carla Morrison as Laura
 Jessica Camacho as Officer Gonzales
 Lupita Ferrer as Sra De La Roca
 Elizabeth Peña as Sra. Soto

Production 
The film was written by Georgina Garcia Riedel (How the Garcia Girls Spent Their Summer) and Jose Nestor Marquez (ISA) from a story by Jose Nestor Marquez. The movie was directed by Riedel. The picture was shot by Tobias Datum and edited by Phillip Bartell (Dear White People). It was produced by Synthetic Cinema International for Fluency.

Release 
The film premiered in the select markets of Los Angeles, Houston and Miami on February 27, 2015.

Critical reception 
The film received coverage in mainstream and Latino press outlets. Joey Leydon of Variety called it an "overlong but modestly amusing bilingual indie", opining that "Those who have at least a nodding acquaintance with the highly addictive serial dramas (telenovelas) will smile even more often than the uninitiated as director and co-scripter Georgina Garcia Riedel (“How the Garcia Girls Spent Their Summer”) affectionately satirizes both the limited-run series and their most avid aficionados."

Referring to the film as a "future slumber party classic", Inkoo Kang said in The Wrap, "This switching-places comedy warmly and trenchantly sends up the telenovela genre’s swooning melodrama and oversexed-but-prudish contradictions." She offered another positive take stating the film was: "A spirited dual performance by Edy Ganem and a pointed telenovela spoof breathe plenty of life into a comedy that offers comfort through familiarity."

Chuck Wilson of LA Weekly called the film ambitious and praised it for having a great set up. He also criticized it, saying, "By its nature, the telenovela world is funnier than ours, but here it's never as inspired as you might hope. Ganem and her talented co-stars work hard, but Riedel's pacing is always a beat or two behind their mad energy, making for a film that's enormously appealing but not quite addicting."

Bel Hernandez of Latin Heat said, "Director Georgina Garcia Riedel directing of the cast, has enabled the film to successful navigate from film to telenovela – with just enough of the stereotypical telenovela melodramatic acting to not get in the way."

Frank Scheck of The Hollywood Reporter wrote that "While this effort directed and co-scripted by Georgina Garcia Riedel lacks true comic inspiration, it provides some genial laughs along the way. ... Despite its relatively brief running time, the film runs out of comic steam long [before] the convoluted proceedings reach their conclusion, with the spoofery having the feel of an overextended variety show skit. But it's mostly enjoyable nonetheless, thanks largely to the charms of its young star who is clearly destined for bigger things."

References

External links 
 

2015 films